The Thomas & Mary Hepworth House is a historic house in Salt Lake City, Utah.

Description and history 
Constructed in 1877, it is locally significant as the only known example of two-story, Italianate I-house design in Salt Lake City. It is significant architecturally as an expression of traditional central-passage plan houses in Utah, but also "updated with more vertical Victorian proportions and with stylish Italianate detailing."

It was listed on the National Register of Historic Places on April 21, 2000.

References

Houses on the National Register of Historic Places in Utah
Italianate architecture in Utah
Houses completed in 1877
Houses in Salt Lake City
I-houses in Utah
National Register of Historic Places in Salt Lake City
1877 establishments in Utah Territory